Stephen A. Orlins (born 1950) has been president of the National Committee on United States–China Relations since May 1, 2005. Prior to this, Orlins was the managing director of The Carlyle Group Asia, one of Asia’s largest (USD 750M) private equity funds. He was also chairman of Taiwan Broadband Communications (TBC) and senior advisor to AEA Investors Inc., a New York based leveraged buyout firm, with responsibility for AEA’s business activities throughout Asia.

Education 
Orlins graduated from Harvard College in 1972 and Harvard Law School in 1976.  He speaks Mandarin Chinese.

Career 
From 1976 to 1979, Orlins served in the Office of the Legal Advisor of the United States Department of State, first in the Office of the Assistant Legal Advisor for Political-Military Affairs and then for East Asian and Pacific Affairs. While in that office, he was a member of the legal team that helped establish diplomatic relations with the People’s Republic of China.

From 1983 to 1991, Orlins was with the investment banking firm of Lehman Brothers where he was a Managing Director from 1985 to 1991. From 1987 to 1990, he served as President of Lehman Brothers Asia.  Based in Hong Kong, he supervised over 150 professionals with offices in Hong Kong, Korea, China, Taiwan, Thailand, Manila and Singapore. Earlier in his career, Orlins practiced law with Coudert Brothers and Paul, Weiss, Rifkind, Wharton & Garrison in New York, Hong Kong, and Beijing.

In 1992 was the Democratic nominee for the United States Congress in New York's 3rd congressional district. 

Orlins is a member of the Council on Foreign Relations.

In July 2022, Orlins helped found a group of U.S. business and policy leaders who share the goal of constructively engaging with China in order to improve U.S.-China relations.

References

  Fox Business: Stephen Orlins discusses President Trump’s tweet on creating a new trade deal with China, May 23, 2018.
  "China now a 'central force'," China Daily, 2018 March 30. 
  Harvard College China Forum: Welcoming Ceremony, 2017.
  New York Institute of Technology Graduation, 2012.

External links
  National Committee on US-China Relations.
  Schwarzman Scholars Academic Advisory Council.
  Harvard College China Forum Advisors.

1950 births
Living people
Harvard Law School alumni
Harvard College alumni
Paul, Weiss, Rifkind, Wharton & Garrison people